Shuttarna is the name of several Mitanni rulers:
Shuttarna I, reigned in the early 15th century BCE
Shuttarna II, reigned in the early 14th century BCE
Shuttarna III, reigned for a short period in the 14th century BCE